Angelica is a female given name and a variant of Angelika.

Meaning
Angelica comes from the Latin angelicus ("angelic"), which in turn is descended from the Greek  (ángelos) meaning "messenger of God" or "angel".

Variations
Angélica (Spanish), Angelika (German, Polish), Angelika, Angyalka, Angyal (Hungarian), Angélique (French), Anjelica, Angelica (Brazilian, English), Anxélica (Galician), Angeliki or Aggeliki (Greek).

Notable Angelicas

Historical
Angélica de Almeida (born 1965), Brazilian long-distance runner
Angélica Aragón (born 1953), Mexican film and telenovela actress
Angelica Balabanoff (1878–1965), Ukrainian Jewish-Italian socialist
Angellica Bell (born 1976), British television and radio presenter
Angelica Bella (active on 1990s), Hungarian pornographic actress
Angelica Bengtsson (born 1993), Swedish pole vaulter
Angelica Bridges (born 1970), American actress
Angelica Burevik (born 1958), Swedish association footballer
Aggeliki Daliani (born 1979), Greek actress
Angelica Garcia (born 1972), American Latin pop star from the 1990s
Angelica Garnett (1918–2012), British writer, painter and artist
Angelica Generosa, American ballet dancer
Angélica Gorodischer (1928–2022), Argentine writer
Angelica Guerrero-Cuellar, American politician
Angelica Hale (born 2007), American singer
Angelica Hamilton (1784–1857), the second child and the first daughter of Elizabeth Schuyler Hamilton and Alexander Hamilton
Anjelica Huston (born 1951), American actress
Angeliki Karapataki (born 1975), Greek water polo player
Angelica Kauffman (1741–1807), Swiss painter
Angélica Ksyvickis (born 1973), Brazilian TV personality.
Angélica Kvieczynski (born 1991), Brazilian rhythmic gymnast
Angelica Mandy (born ca 1997), English actress
Angélica María (born 1944), Mexican actress and singer
Angelica Martinelli (fl. 1578), Italian actress
Angelica Panganiban (born 1986), Filipina actress and model
Angelica Schuyler Church (1756–1814), member of American Schuyler family
Aggeliki Tsiolakoudi (born 1976), Greek javelin thrower
Angélica Vale (born 1975), Mexican-American actress
Angelica Van Buren (1818–1877), daughter-in-law of the 8th United States President
Angelica Zawadzki (born 1952), Mexican sprint canoer
Mother Angelica (Rita Antoinette Rizzo, 1923–2016), American Roman Catholic nun and founder of the Eternal Word Television Network
American wrestler Lita, whose ring name once was Angelica.

Fictional
 Angelica is a princess of Cathay in Orlando innamorato (1483–1495) and Orlando Furioso (1516–1532)
 Angelica Jones, real name of Marvel's hero Firestar.
Angelica Pickles (active since 1991) is a cartoon character from the American animated series Rugrats, and the show's spin-off Rugrats: All Grown Up.

References

Feminine given names
English feminine given names
Romanian feminine given names
Italian feminine given names
Filipino feminine given names